Pieljekaise is a Swedish national park. The park consists largely of birch woods.

The park is traversed by the Kungsleden hiking trail and the trail continues into the nearby the Vindelfjällens Nature Reserve, one of the largest protected areas in Europe.

References

External links 
 Sweden's National Parks: Pieljekaise National Park from the Swedish Environmental Protection Agency

National parks of Sweden
Protected areas established in 1909
1909 establishments in Sweden
Geography of Norrbotten County
Tourist attractions in Norrbotten County
Lapland (Sweden)